The comic book stories published by Marvel Comics since the 1940s have featured several noteworthy concepts besides its fictional characters, such as unique places and artifacts. There follows a list of those features.

Places
Certain places feature prominently in the Marvel Universe, some real-life, others fictional and unique to the setting; fictional places may appear in conjunction with, or even within, real-world locales.

Earth

New York City
Many Marvel Comics stories are set in New York City, where the publishing company is based.

Superhero sites
New York is the site of many places important to superheroes:
 Avengers Mansion: Currently in ruin, but long the home of the Avengers.
 Avengers Tower: Formerly Stark Tower, the current headquarters of the Avengers.
 Alias Investigations: The private investigations firm founded and owned by Jessica Jones.
 Baxter Building and Four Freedoms Plaza: The bases of the Fantastic Four.
 Daily Bugle: A newspaper building where Peter Parker (Spider-Man) works as a photographer for J. Jonah Jameson.
 Fisk Towers: A skyscraper owned by Kingpin Wilson Fisk, and base of operations for his criminal activities.
 Hell's Kitchen: Home and protectorate of the Defenders (Daredevil, Jessica Jones, Luke Cage and Iron Fist) and The Punisher.
 Nelson and Murdock Law Offices: The law firm founded by Matt Murdock (Daredevil) and Foggy Nelson.
 Sanctum Sanctorum: The abode of Doctor Strange located in Greenwich Village.
 Oscorp Tower: A skyscraper owned by Norman Osborn. Now the headquarters for Alchemax.
 Mutant Town/District X: A ghetto-like neighborhood of New York primarily populated by mutants. Since the Decimation, its mutant population has largely disappeared.
 The Bowery: In Fantastic Four #4 (1962), the Fantastic Four's Human Torch discovers the 1940s-era character Namor in this Manhattan neighborhood of "human derelicts", where Namor had taken up residence after the onset of retrograde amnesia about his identity.
 Wakandan embassy: The consulate/embassy of Black Panther's nation of Wakanda.

Companies
New York is a center of industry, serving as the headquarters for a few Marvel companies:
 Alchemax: A company owned by Tyler Stone.
 Cross Technological Enterprises: A multinational industrial company run by Darren Cross. It is a rival of Stark Industries.
 Fisk Industries: A legitimate business on the surface founded and owned by Wilson Fisk.
 Frost International: A multi billion-dollar electronics conglomerate run by Emma Frost.
 Hammer Industries: A company that was founded and owned by Justin Hammer.
 Horizon Labs: A leading company in creating the most advanced technology on Earth headed by Max Modell.
 Oscorp: A company that was founded and formerly owned by Norman Osborn.
 Parker Industries: A company that was founded and owned by Peter Parker.
 Pym Technologies: A biochemical company that was founded by Hank Pym.
 Roxxon Energy Corporation: A conglomerates corporation and one of the largest fuel companies in the world.
 Stark Industries: A company that was founded and owned by Isaac Stark Sr later by Howard Stark and Tony Stark.
 Trask Industries: A weapons and technology company founded and owned by Bolivar Trask.
 Von Doom Industries: An international megacorporation founded by Victor Von Doom, who is the CEO.

Universities
Two universities are also especially prominent in the Marvel Universe:
 Columbia University: A real university whose fictional alumni include Matt Murdock (Daredevil), Elektra, and Reed Richards (Mister Fantastic). Featured in the Sam Raimi Spider-Man films. 
 Empire State University (ESU): A fictional university whose alumni include Peter Parker (Spider-Man), Harry Osborn, Gwen Stacy, Emma Frost, and Johnny Storm (the Human Torch).  Doreen Green (Squirrel Girl) is currently enrolled in its computer science undergraduate program.

Regions and countries 
 Atlantis: A small continent with many human settlements. Over 21,000 years ago, an event called the "Great Cataclysm" caused it to be submerged into the sea. The inhabitants of ancient Atlantis built an enormous glass-like dome over the capital city, also known as Atlantis. When barbarians sent by the Deviant Lemuria empire attacked Atlantis, King Kamuu opened the magma-pits which were the city's means of heating. This caused the continent to sink. Kamuu was warned of the Great Cataclysm by the seer, Zhered-Na. When she refused to recant, he had her exiled to the mainland, where she was later stabbed to death by survivors of the submersion.
 Attilan (also called the Hidden Land): Home of the Inhumans. Originally an island in the North Atlantic Ocean, it has moved several times, including to the Andes, the Himalayas, the Blue Area of the Moon, and the homeworld of the alien Kree, Hala. Attilan is destroyed during the events of Infinity by Black Bolt when he detonates the Terrigen Bomb. The remains of Attilan subsequently reside within New York, in the Hudson estuary. The remains become a sovereign state, New Attilan, ruled by Medusa.
 Attilan in other media
 Animation
 Attilan appears in Hulk and the Agents of S.M.A.S.H. episode "Inhuman Nature". Crystal takes A-Bomb, who falls in love with her. Hulk, Red Hulk, She-Hulk and Skaar track him down and meet the Inhumans upon being captured, but they break free to stop Maximus from using a weapon that he plans to destroy humanity. Failing, Atillan is locked in a barrier by Maximus that protects the city Attilan, from the rest of the world, but is ultimately destroyed by Black Bolt.
 Attilan appears in Ultimate Spider-Man episode "Inhumanity". The city is controlled by Maximus as king to destroy humanity. But Spider-Man and Triton defeated him and with the help of Black Bolt, Atillan fell back.
 Attilan appears in the Guardians of the Galaxy episode "Crystal Blue Persuasion", when Ronan the Accuser makes a deal with Maximus using terrifying crystals with the Inhumans, and episode "Inhuman Touch", the Guardians of the Galaxy go to Attilan again to speak with Maximus about the location of the Cosmic Seed, until he plans to escape his cell to control it and destroy any nearby planet.
 Attilan appears in Avengers Assemble. In season 3, episode "Inhumans Among Us", it is said that the Hulk knows of them, when Inhuman Royal Family arrive from facing the Avengers and help them stop the Terrigena plague of Primitive Alphas and an emerged inhuman called Inferno. In episode, "The Inhuman Condition", Atillan city is taken over by Ultron and using the Inhumans to create a dangerous weapon on Earth and at the end, the fog spreads on Earth and Atillan lands to search for new Inhumans. In "Civil War, Part 1: The Fall of Attilan", after the Avengers capture Maximus and bring him to Attilan, he causes Inferno to enrage and destroy all of Attilan. Truman Marsh goes ahead with the Inhumans Registration Act where the Inhumans will have inscription discs imposed on them after the destruction of Atillan. At the end of "Civil War, Part 4: Avengers Revolution", Attilan is rebuilt again. In season 5, episode "Mists of Attilan", Black Panther take Ms. Marvel on a mission to Attilan.
 Attilan appears in the second season of Marvel Future Avengers. Following an outbreak of Terrigen Mist, the Inhumans claim custody of the afflicted and take them to Attilan. As a result, the Avengers, Future Avengers and Ms. Marvel attempt to broker peace between Earth and Attilanto reunite those taken with their families on Earth.
Live action
 In Agents of S.H.I.E.L.D., in the middle of season 2, Gordon, an Inhuman, reveals to the already transformed Raina that there is an island not explored by man where Inhumans live, implying that he refers to Attilan, being this is his first reference in Marvel Cinematic Universe and a support to appear in the Inhumans series at the end of 2017. The "Beyond" is the home of the Inhumans on Earth located in the mountain range of China and is isolated from society and led by Inhuman elders and Jiaying before its collapse during the war with S.H.I.E.L.D. similarity with the version "The Great Refuge" of Attilan, which is also found in the mountain range of China.
 In the Marvel Television-produced TV series Inhumans, at some point in history, a civilization of Inhumans decided to leave Earth to colonize the Moon. They built the city of Attilan in a protective dome, protecting it and keeping it hidden from humans and Kree. After Triton's disappearance, Maximus started the revolution by taking over Atillan and causing the royal family (Black Bolt, Medusa, Gorgon, Karnak, Crystal, and Lockjaw) to escape to Earth and send his allies to pursue them. In the series finale, Attilan's protective dome is compromised by Maximus's plan to retain control and ultimately collapses. Fortunately, the royal family is able to organize an evacuation to Earth to save the people of Attilan, with the help of NASA. The destruction of Attilan seems to send a signal to Hala, or possibly another Kree outpost. This may indicate the imminent danger that Black Bolt warned Medusa about. With the help of the humans, Black Bolt and Medusa lead the Inhumans to build a new Attilan on Earth.
 Bagalia: A sovereign island nation in an undisclosed location established by the Shadow Council. It is ruled by criminals and populated by the Shadow Council's incarnation of the Masters of Evil.
 Chronopolis: The city-state headquarters of Kang the Conqueror, located on the outskirts of the timeless dimension Limbo. With access-points to all of the time eras that Kang has conquered, each city block exists in its own time period.
 A variation of Chronopolis appears in Lego Marvel Super Heroes 2. This version is a myriad of 17 different Marvel locations (consisting of a variation of Ancient Egypt, an apocalyptic Asgard, Attilan, Hala, the Hydra Empire, K'un-L'un, Knowhere, Lemuria, Man-Thing's Swamp, Manhattan, an alternate version of Medieval England, a Marvel Noir version of New York City called Manhattan Noir, Nueva York of 2099, a variation of the Old West, Sakaar, Wakanda, and Xandar linked through time and space and surrounding Kang the Conqueror's Citadel.
 Deviant Lemuria: The undersea home of the Deviants located at the bottom of the Pacific Ocean.
 Dynamo City: An interstellar city and space port for dynamism controlled by a municipal government.
 Genosha: The island dwarf-nation off the coast of Africa, north of Madagascar; an apartheid-like state where mutants were once enslaved.
 Hyboria: The main continent of the Hyborian Age where Conan the Barbarian lived.
 Imaya: A country in North Africa.
 Kamar-Taj: A small kingdom in the Himalayas.
 Krakoa: A living island in the South Pacific.
 K'un-Lun: A mystical city that only appears periodically on the earthly plane. The father of Daniel Rand, the boy who would later become Iron Fist, discovered K'un-Lun. It was there that Danny gained his powers and became Iron Fist. Its most prominent inhabitants are Master Khan, Yu-Ti, Ferocia, Shou-Lao, and Lei Kung. The usual means of access to this dimension is through magic.
 Latveria: A country in Europe ruled by Doctor Doom.
 Lemuria: A small continent and group of islands in the Pacific Ocean 21,000 years ago, which was ruled by the Deviants. Lemuria became the center of the Deviant Empire, and the only remaining free land was Atlantis, the continent that held its greatest enemy, the Atlantean Empire. When the Deviants attacked Atlantis, the Atlantean King Kamuu opened the magma-pits which were the city's means of heating. This caused a chain reaction which collapsed and sank the continent. At that same time, when the Second Host of the Celestials came to Earth, the Deviants attacked them. In retaliation, the Celestials sank Lemuria in what is now known as the "Great Cataclysm". The Eternal Ikaris guided a ship of humans to safety.
 Madripoor: A city modeled after Singapore, to which Wolverine has connections.
 Monster Isle: An island where monsters rule.
 Muir Island: An island off the northwest coast of Scotland, containing Moira MacTaggert's mutant research lab. Muir Island's significance stems from the fact that it is the home of Earth's largest and most comprehensive mutant research complex, located to the north of Scotland, founded by Dr. Moira MacTaggert. Originally, she created the facility to help her son, Kevin (a.k.a. Proteus), an extremely powerful and destructive mutant.
 Nova Roma: The home of Magma in Brazil. Ancient Rome-like city.
 Olympia: Mountain city of the Eternals, located on Mount Olympus in Greece.
 Project Pegasus: A scientific base which has been the location of a variety of stories for superheroes and supervillains, most notably in the title Marvel Two-in-One. Created in Marvel Two-in-One #42 (August 1978) by writer Ralph Macchio, Project Pegasus was originally intended to research alternative (and unusual) forms of energy, but has also been used as a prison for super-powered individuals. The location of this facility is described as being in the Adirondack Mountains in New York State.
 Providence: An artificial island made of parts from Cable's old space station, Graymalkin, located in the South Pacific Ocean, southwest of Hawaii. Providence was intended to be a place where the best minds on Earth could gather, live, and find new ways of doing everything in hopes of giving the world a peaceful future. Providence was open to all who wish to immigrate there, though all residents must undergo various psychological and skills tests. Providence would later be destroyed by Cable himself, to keep the future evidence of the Messiah Child's birth away from the Marauders.
 Savage Land: A place with tropical climates, prehistoric animals, and strange tribes located in the heart of Antarctica.
 Slorenia: An eastern Slavic nation.
 Sokovia: An Eastern European nation. The nation first appeared in Avengers: Age of Ultron where the titular Avengers fought Ultron. As a result of the damage and chaos during the "Battle of Sokovia" its aftermath led to the United Nations creating the "Sokovia Accords". Sokovia has since appeared in mainstream comics. In the MCU, Helmut Zemo is a citizen and former member of Sokovian special forces. Wanda Maximoff and her brother Pietro are citizens of Sokovia before becoming members of the Avengers. The Falcon and the Winter Soldier reveals that the battle eventually resulted in Sokovia's territory being annexed by surrounding countries.
 Subterranea: A vast underground region. Home of the Mole Man and his servants the Moloids, Tyrannus and his servants the Tyrannoids (an offshoot of the Moloids), and the Lava Men, among other races.
 Symkaria: A country in Europe adjoining Latveria, home of Silver Sable.
 Transia: The birthplace of Spider-Woman, Quicksilver, and the Scarlet Witch. The men of the Russoff line were afflicted with the curse of lycanthropy here. It is the base of operations for the High Evolutionary, and source of the "radioactive clay" used by the Puppet Master. In the sixth century AD, a cult of Darkholders led by the sorceress Morgan le Fey attempted to summon Chthon but found him to be uncontrollable. While the Darkholders were incapable of banishing him altogether, they bound him to Mount Wundagore, in what would one day become Transia.
 Vorozheika: A country to the northeast of Chechnya, formerly part of the USSR and now ruled by the Eternal Druig.
 Wakanda: An African nation ruled by T'Challa, the current Black Panther.

Prisons

Alcatraz
Alcatraz is a real-life island prison in San Francisco Bay that was operational in 1859–1963. In the Marvel universe, it held superhuman criminals in special section in the 1940s; the designation "the Alcatraz Annex" has been used in various Marvel handbooks to distinguish it from Alcatraz in general. First mentioned in Marvel Mystery Comics #26 (1941), when the android Human Torch's foe the Parrot was being transported there. Later seen in Human Torch #8 (1942), when the golden age Angel's foe the Python escaped.

During the "Dark Reign" storyline, Alcatraz was occupied by H.A.M.M.E.R., who used it as a detention center for the mutants that the Dark Avengers apprehended.

During the "AXIS" storyline, Iron Man used Alcatraz as the site of Stark Island.

Alamogordo
Alamogordo is a nuclear testing facility in New Mexico that held the Armageddon Man and perhaps others in suspended animation. First appeared in X-Men (vol. 2) #12 (1992).

Cage
Based on a remote island in international waters, the Cage is a prison that uses a special forcefield to depower inmates.

The Cage was home to four prison gangs: a group of Maggia loyalists, the Skulls (a white supremacist gang loyal to the Red Skull), the Brothers (a black prison gang), and the Cruisers (a cabal of sexual predators who preyed on the other inmates as best as they could). The Cage was later shut down and its role was replaced by the Raft.

Mystique was imprisoned in The Cage for one day before she escaped in All-New X-Men #14.

Created by writer Frank Tieri and artist Sean Chen in the pages of Wolverine (vol. 2) #164 (2001).

Crossmore Prison
Crossmore Prison is Her (Britannic) Majesty's Ultimate Security Prison that was previously known as Crossmoor.

Deadpool and Juggernaut were known inmates here.

Cube
The Cube is a prison for super-powered beings such as Hulk, Abomination, Absorbing Man, and Leader. Its location is undisclosed and only high-ranking S.H.I.E.L.D. agents know of its existence. It has a special program where prisoners are brainwashed to become obedient soldiers.

The Cube was created by writer Grant Morrison and artist J. G. Jones in Marvel Boy #6 (2000).

When last seen in  Civil War: Young Avengers & Runaways #4, Marvel Boy had taken control of the entire facility. During the Dark Reign storyline, the Cube served as the Thunderbolts' base of operations.

Cube in other media
The Cube appears in The Avengers: Earth's Mightiest Heroes. First appearing in the episode "Breakout, Part 1", this version is a S.H.I.E.L.D. prison for gamma-powered supervillains and housed the Leader, the Abomination, Absorbing Man, Madman, the U-Foes, the Wrecking Crew, Bi-Beast, Radioactive Man, and Zzzax before a mysterious technological fault allowed them to escape. In the two-part episode "Gamma World", the Leader uses the Cube as a staging ground to turn the world into gamma monsters before the Avengers defeat him.

Ice Box
The Ice Box is a Canadian maximum security prison. The Ice Box held a crime lord named Ivan the Terrible.

The Ice Box first appeared in Maverick #8.

Ice Box in other media
The Ice Box appears in the 2018 film Deadpool 2, housing mutant fugitives such as Deadpool, Rusty Collins, Black Tom Cassidy, and the Juggernaut.

Lang Memorial Penitentiary
Also known as the Pym Experimental Prison #1 (and ironically dubbed "The Big House"), inmates in the Lang Memorial Penitentiary are shrunk down using Pym particles for cheaper storage and easier control. It is also known as the "Ant Hill" due to operators using versions of the Ant-Man helmet to influence ants to act as security within the prison.

Known inmates of the facility were 8-Ball, Absorbing Man, Dragon Man, Electro, Figment, Grey Gargoyle, Mad Thinker, Mandrill, Rhino, Sandman, Scarecrow, Scorpion, Silencer, Southpaw, Titania, Tiger Shark, the U-Foes (Ironclad, Vapor, Vector, X-Ray), Vermin, Whirlwind, and the Wrecking Crew (Wrecker, Bulldozer, Piledriver, Thunderball).

The Big House in other media
The Big House appears in The Avengers: Earth's Mightiest Heroes. First introduced in the eponymous micro-series episode "The Big House" (later incorporated into the first-season episode, "The Man in the Ant Hill"), it is established as a miniaturized prison for superhuman criminals developed by Hank Pym for S.H.I.E.L.D., housed inside a single room on S.H.I.E.L.D.'s Helicarrier and internally maintained by benign incarnations of Ultron. Some of its most notable inmates include the Mad Thinker, Whirlwind, Grey Gargoyle, and members of the Serpent Society. The placement within the Helicarrier proves disastrous in the series premiere, "Breakout", as a massive prison escape across several superhuman penitentiaries results in the Big House growing to full size, causing enough internal damage to cause the Helicarrier to crash.

Project Pegasus
Created in Marvel Two-in-One #42 (August 1978) by writers Mark Gruenwald and Ralph Macchio, Project Pegasus (Potential Energy Group, Alternate Sources, United States) was originally intended to research alternative (and unusual) forms of energy. It was later used as a prison for super-powered individuals with energy-based powers. It was originally located in the Adirondack Mountains, New York.

Several heroes have served terms working security at the facility, including the Thing and Quasar. At one time, it also served as a temporary home for the Squadron Supreme when they were exiled from their own universe.

In the Ultimate Marvel reality, P.E.G.A.S.U.S. appeared in the series Ultimate Power. This Project P.E.G.A.S.U.S was located in Devil's Point, Wyoming. It was a S.H.I.E.L.D. program that served to store all objects of mysterious origin or unexplained power that United States authorities had accumulated over the years, in which every precaution was made to keep the objects safe. Originally, Project Pegasus was the center of "S.H.I.E.L.D.'s universe" (something that the recent directors of S.H.I.E.L.D., Carol Danvers and Nick Fury, were completely unaware of). It was later reduced to a storage house, but still kept some of the original facility which included an underground laboratory. Project Pegasus was attacked two times by the Serpent Squad, who had come for the Serpent Crown that was stored there, and was protected by the Fantastic Four, Spider-Man, Iceman, and Rick Jones. P.E.G.A.S.U.S. also housed the Watcher Uatu after it was discovered by American personnel at Project Rebirth, until Uatu was "activated" and forewarned the Fantastic Four, Carol Danvers, and P.E.G.A.S.U.S.'s overseer, Wendell Vaughn, about an upcoming cataclysm before it disappeared. Following the events of Ultimatum, Project P.E.G.A.S.U.S. was put on alert in the wake of unexplained attacks on the Baxter Building and Roxxon Industries. P.E.G.A.S.U.S.'s personnel were aided by Captain Mahr-Vehl, but Mahr-Vehl was infected with an unknown virus and went berserk, attacking P.E.G.A.S.U.S. personnel. Mahr-Vehl was transported away by Rick Jones/Nova, but that left Project P.E.G.A.S.U.S. vulnerable. It was invaded by the true instigator of the attacks, Reed Richards, who pilfered the facility's valuable possessions.

Project Pegasus in other media
 Project Pegasus appears in Iron Man: Armored Adventures. This version is an energy research facility led by Russian scientist Anton Harchov and located in New York City that is later absorbed into Stark International under Obadiah Stane.
 Project P.E.G.A.S.U.S. appears in films set in the Marvel Cinematic Universe. This version of the organization is a joint venture between the United States Air Force and NASA that S.H.I.E.L.D. later took over to investigate phenomena beyond the range of conventional scientific understanding. In the 1990s, Project: P.E.G.A.S.U.S. played host to the Tesseract until the present, during which Loki steals it, destroying the facility in the process. The organization first appears in Thor and makes subsequent appearances in The Avengers and Captain Marvel.

The Raft
The Raft  is a prison facility for super-human criminals (predominantly supervillains). Created by writer Brian Michael Bendis and artist David Finch, it first appeared in The New Avengers #1 (2005) as the "Maximum-Maximum Security" wing of the Ryker's Island Maximum Security Penitentiary. The Raft is introduced as the setting of a large-scale prison break, with the New Avengers being concerned when their analysis of computer records shows that some of the Raft's inmates are listed as having been dead for years. One of the former guards notes that the prisoners developed "hierarchies", congregating with others who share some aspect of their powers or nature. Crossfire, for example, formed a small gang with Controller, Corruptor, Mandrill and Mister Fear, who all can manipulate others' minds.

The Raft is the setting of a multi-part story in Spider-Man's Tangled Web featuring Tombstone as a villain-protagonist.
 
The Raft was later converted into Spider-Island Two by Otto Octavius (in Peter Parker's body) until it was destroyed by the Goblin King.

The Raft in other media
 The Raft appears in The Avengers: Earth's Mightiest Heroes, with Graviton, Heinrich Zemo, Wendigo, and Purple Man as prominent inmates.
 The Raft appears in media set in the Marvel Cinematic Universe. 
 The prison first appears in the film Captain America: Civil War, with Thaddeus Ross serving as warden. Sam Wilson, Wanda Maximoff, Clint Barton, and Scott Lang are sent to and imprisoned at the Raft after helping Steve Rogers and the Winter Soldier evade capture, which was in violation of the Sokovia Accords. However, Rogers eventually breaks them out.
 The Raft makes a minor appearance in the miniseries The Falcon and the Winter Soldier episode "One World, One People", with Helmut Zemo as a prominent inmate.
 In a deleted scene from Deadpool, Ajax is escorted by boat to "The Raft Prison".
 The Raft appears in Lego Marvel Super Heroes, with Magneto as a prominent inmate until he is broken out by Sabretooth and Mystique, though the former is captured by Iron Man, the Hulk, and Wolverine.
 The Raft appears in Spider-Man, with Electro, the Kingpin, the Rhino, the Scorpion, the Vulture, Mister Negative, and Doctor Octopus as prominent inmates.
 The Raft appears in Marvel Ultimate Alliance 3: The Black Order, with Doctor Octopus, Sandman, Mysterio, Electro, and Venom as prominent inmates.

Ravencroft
Ravencroft Institute for the Criminally Insane was a maximum-security asylum for the mentally ill. Many insane or mentally ill murderers and supervillains were kept at Ravencroft.

The institute was first mentioned in Web of Spider-Man #112, written by Terry Kavanagh.

The institute is officially opened in Web of Spider-Man Annual #10 (1994). The institute is featured in a number of Spider-Man storylines. Dr. Ashley Kafka was the founder and first director of Ravencroft. John Jameson was head of security. Both were fired in The Spectacular Spider-Man #246 and Dr. Leonard Samson became Ravencroft's new director. In Leonard Samson's next appearance, he owned a private practice instead of running the institute.

The institute reappeared in Vengeance of the Moon Knight. In this incarnation, it housed mostly non-superpowered psychopaths and had an imposing metal front gate with a Gothic facade similar to DC's Arkham Asylum.

Known patients at Ravencroft include Carnage, Chameleon, D.K., Doctor Octopus, Electro, Green Goblin, Gale, Jackal, Massacre, Mayhem, Mysterio, Prism, Pyromania, Ramon Grant, Shriek, Venom, Vulture, and Webber.

The storyline after Absolute Carnage, Ruins of Ravencroft eventually explains its true origin. It turns out that the institute is more than just for the criminally insane. It used to act as a staging area for superhuman experiments, particularly supernaturals such as for Dracula in centuries ago prior to being raided by Captain America-Steve Rogers and Bucky (now a Winter Soldier in the present) during World War II in the 20th century.

Ravencroft in other media
 Ravencroft appears in Spider-Man.
 Ravencroft appears in The Spectacular Spider-Man, with Electro, Doctor Octopus, Cletus Kasady, John Jameson, and Venom as known patients.
 Ravencroft appears in The Amazing Spider-Man 2, with Dr. Ashley Kafka as a leading scientist and Electro as a patient until Harry Osborn breaks him out.
 Ravencroft also appears in the tie-in video game of the same name, in which Oscorp uses it to conduct secret experiments.
 Ravencroft appears in Venom: Let There Be Carnage, with Shriek as a prominent inmate.

Ryker's Island
Ryker's Island is the Marvel Universe counterpart to the real-world Rikers Island, New York City's largest jail facility, which also includes the 415 acre (1.7 km2) island on which it sits.

The Ryker's houses both conventional criminals and costumed offenders lacking superpowers. Daredevil is held there after his arrest in Daredevil (vol. 2) #80.

In The Amazing Spider-Man (vol. 4) #1, Ryker's Island has been renamed the "Cellar" when it was bought and improved by Empire Unlimited.

Others held there include Alistair Smythe, Blacklash, Black Tarantula, Blizzard, the Brotherhood of Mutants (Avalanche, Blob, Destiny, Mystique, Pyro), Bullseye, Carnage, Chemistro, Cheshire Cat, Cobra, Commanche, Dontrell "Cockroach" Hamilton, Enforcers (Fancy Dan, Montana, Ox II), Griffin, Hood, Jigsaw, Kingpin, Melter, Mister Hyde, Mr. Fish II, Nitro, Punisher, Rhino, Sandman, Spear, Spider-Man, Turk Barrett, Ulik, Venom, Vin Gonzales, Wizard, and the Wrecking Crew (Bulldozer, Piledriver, Thunderball, Wrecker).

Ryker's Island has a special branch for dangerous superhuman criminals called the Raft.

Ryker's Island in other media
 Ryker's Island appears in the 1990s Spider-Man animated series.
 Ryker's Island appears in The Spectacular Spider-Man.
 Ryker's Island appears in the Ultimate Spider-Man episode "Return of the Sinister Six".
 Ryker's Island appears in the Marvel Cinematic Universe (MCU) television series Daredevil and Luke Cage, while also being mentioned in Jessica Jones and The Punisher. In Daredevil, disgraced philanthropist and crime lord Wilson Fisk is imprisoned on the island as consequence for being exposed by detective Carl Hoffman and being apprehended by the vigilante Daredevil and Brett Mahoney. While there, he builds connections with another incarcerated inmate, Frank Castle, eventually using his influence to help Castle escape Ryker's Island and usurp fellow inmate Dutton, who had built a criminal empire and previously controlled the facility. He later bribes facility warden Riggle into allowing inmate Jasper Evans to make an attempt on his life, convincing the F.B.I. that Fisk was not safe in prison, and allowing him to relocate to the Presidential Hotel in New York City where he would be able to reassume more direct control over his criminal operations. Matt Murdock later infiltrates Ryker's Island to gather information on Fisk's release, impersonating Franklin Nelson to get inside the facility. While there, he is assaulted and drugged by a corrupt nurse, dulling his superhuman senses. While locked in one of the faculty rooms, he is called and taunted by Fisk regarding his previous visitation while he was still imprisoned on the island, with Fisk hanging up before Murdock can respond. He is then confronted by and successfully defeats a group of inmates dispatched by Fisk to kill Murdock, before successfully escaping the prison with the help of the guards amidst an ongoing riot amongst the inmates.

Seagate Prison
Seagate Prison (also called "Little Alcatraz") where the wrongly convicted Carl Lucas agreed to become a test subject for Dr. Noah Burstein. These experiments lead to him gaining super powers. He changed his name to Luke Cage.

Known inmates of Seagate Prison are Beetle, Comanche, Crimebuster (Eugene Mason), Noah Burstein, Plantman, Robert Rackham, and Shades.

Seagate Prison in other media
Seagate Prison appears in the Marvel Cinematic Universe Marvel One-Shot All Hail the King and the Netflix series Luke Cage. Justin Hammer, Trevor Slattery, Luke Cage, Comanche, and Shades were all inmates, while Noah Burstein and Reva Connors were among Seagate's staff.

The Vault

The United States Maximum Security Installation for the Incarceration of Superhuman Criminals., known as The Vault, is a defunct prison facility for super-human criminals (predominantly supervillains) in Marvel Comics' Marvel Universe. It first appeared in The Avengers Annual #15 (1986) and figured prominently in the 1990 Marvel crossover "Acts of Vengeance". It was destroyed in Heroes for Hire #1 (February 1997).

Other locations
 Avengers Compound: The former headquarters of the West Coast Avengers.
 Bar with no name: There are different bars with no name that appear in different locations. The first one seen was in Medina County, Ohio where it was the site of a villain massacre caused by Scourge of the Underworld at the time when Firebrand called a meeting there. Another one appears in New York where it is seen in different locations where it can be found through a word of mouth. A bartender named Deke works there and claims that it is a sanctuary for those fleeing the law.
 The bar with no name appears in the Spider-Man DLC "The City That Never Sleeps".
 Citrusville, Cypress County, Florida: It is in the Everglades and appears most frequently in stories related to Man-Thing. Much of its importance lies in that it is physically near what is termed as the Nexus of All Realities. The town is depicted as very traditional and conservative. However, it is also home to the Cult of Zhered-Na, its leader, Joshua Kale, and his grandchildren, Jennifer and Andy. The high school newspaper is called the Quill.
 Caldecott: A western Mississippi county and town where the X-Men's Rogue was born.
 Darkmoor: The location of both the Darkmoor Energy Research Centre (a high-tech, top secret government facility at which University student Brian Braddock is doing work experience) and a stone circle which was a centre of great mystical power. As the Captain Britain mythos expanded, it also played host to Darkmoor Prison and to the sinister Darkmoor Castle, home of the Black Baron.
 The Fridge: S.H.I.E.L.D's most secure base that first appears in Agents of S.H.I.E.L.D. Home of the Slingshot Program and detainment area of most S.H.I.E.L.D prisoners like Ian Quinn and Marcus Daniels. Contains the unstable element Gravitonium on a top secret level at the bottom. The Fridge was raided and taken over by HYDRA.
 Gamma Base: Also known as Hulkbusters Base, and Desert Base. Originally a New Mexico base/Los Diablos Missile Base dedicated to Hulk's capture (Project Greenskin) headed up by Thunderbolt Ross. After the birth of the Hulk, Desert Base would be updated to also could hold other gamma-powered superhumans. The base later relocated to Nevada, and was acquired by Operation: Zero Tolerance, which became Hulkbuster Base and Ross was eventually replaced by Colonel John J. Armbruster. Months later Armbruster perished in the line of duty, Hulkbuster base was given direction by S.H.I.E.L.D. and Clay Quartermain was assigned as liaison. Shortly thereafter Hulk Buster Base was renamed Gamma Base. Gamma Base became Ross' headquarters once more as the Red Hulk when he was recruited by Steve Rogers, who had replaced Norman Osborn, during that time Gamma Base was staffed entirely by Life Model Decoys. 
 Grand Nixon Island: An island owned by disgraced ex-U.S. Army general General Kreigkopf. The island itself contains Kreigkopf's military base surrounded by a vast jungle environment. The island features in The Punisher comic book series in issue #3 to issue #5. The former introduces General Kreigkopf and Grand Nixon Island.
 Graymalkin Industries: The undercover name for X-Men new headquarters in San Francisco following their departure from their former X-Mansion, destroyed during Messiah Complex. It is the base of operations and training site of the X-Men. It is located on the Marin Headlands just north of San Francisco, being built into the long-abandoned military bunkers that line the cliff overlooking the Pacific Ocean.
 HUB: S.H.I.E.L.D's main HQ as seen in Agents of S.H.I.E.L.D. The HUB was once taken over by HYDRA. S.H.I.E.L.D retook the HUB with Agent Phil Coulson's team.
 Hydro-Base: A floating seacraft disguised as a natural island floating off the coast of North America outside US territorial waters. Its first known user was the mad ecologist Dr. Herman Frayne (a.k.a. Doctor Hydro) who used it both as a laboratory and an airbase on which to land hijacked planes. Doctor Hydro planned to turn the planes' passengers into amphibious people, using Terrigen Mist he acquired from the renegade Inhuman Maelstrom.
 The Massachusetts Academy: A prep school founded in the 18th century in Snow Valley, in the Berkshire Mountains of Massachusetts. The academy is one of the oldest and most respected college preparatory schools in the United States. Administered by Emma Frost for most of its modern history, the Massachusetts Academy also had a long-standing alliance with the Hellfire Club. In addition to a large student body, the academy also houses a clandestine school for young mutants. During her time as the Hellfire Club's White Queen, Frost trained a group known as the Hellions; the Hellions would become long-standing rivals with the New Mutants.
 Salem Center: A hamlet in the town of North Salem, Westchester County, New York.
 X-Mansion: The home of the X-Men, located in Salem Center. It has also been known as 'Xavier's School for Gifted Youngsters.
 Red Room: A Soviet training facility that was created to produce highly specialized spies, including Black Widows Natalia Romanova and Yelena Belova.
 Red Room in other media Animation The Red Room is alluded in The Avengers: Earth's Mightiest Heroes. It was used as Natalia Romanoff's password in the micro-episode "Beware the Widow's Bite" (which was later included as part of the episode "Hulk vs the World").
 The Red Room is alluded in Avengers Assemble. Nighthawk uses this in the episode "Nighthawk" as a sleeper codeword to knock Natalia Romanoff out as part of a S.H.I.E.L.D. contingency plan in the event that the Avengers either went rogue or were mind-controlled carefully planned out by Sam Wilson. In the third season the Red Room is properly mentioned when Black Widow admits she has few to no memories of her life before the Red Room as a result of her brainwashing.Live action The Red Room appears in the Marvel Cinematic Universe. 
 The television series Agent Carter depicts Dorothy "Dottie" Underwood (portrayed by Bridget Regan) as a precursor to the Black Widow program.
 The 2015 film Avengers: Age of Ultron shows Natasha Romanoff forced to recall her own training in the Red Room by Madame B. (portrayed by Julie Delpy) due to Wanda Maximoff's mind controlling spells.
 The Red Room featured in the Black Widow film headed by former USSR General Dreykov using the Taskmaster as enforcer. This incarnation of the Red Room was destroyed by ex-Widows Natasha Romanoff, Yelena Belova, and Melina Vostokoff, as well as Dreykov's former partner, Red Guardian/Alexei Shostakov after Captain America: Civil War.
 Valhalla Villas: A retirement home in Florida where the heroes and villains of the Golden Age reside. It is owned by Mary Morgan. Known residents are Golden Girl, Doctor Fear, Thunderer, Leopard Girl, Human Top, Sun Girl, American Ace, Flash Foster, and Wax Master.

Outer space
Planets
 Counter-Earth: There have been four versions of the hypothetical planet known as Counter-Earth, each one a near-duplicate of Earth.
 High Evolutionary's Counter-Earth: The first Counter-Earth was created by the High Evolutionary with the help of at least some of the Infinity Gems as part of his "Project Alpha". The High Evolutionary artificially creates a Counter-Earth specifically located to hide it from "True Earth", on which he has greatly accelerated evolution and the passage of time.
 Goddess's Counter-Earth: The second Counter-Earth, dubbed Paradise Omega, was created by the Goddess using the Cosmic Egg, a collection of 30 Cosmic Cubes.
 Franklin Richards's Counter-Earth: The third Counter-Earth was created by Franklin Richards in the transition from the Onslaught storyline to the Heroes Reborn event. As Franklin watched the Fantastic Four, Avengers and others sacrifice their lives to defeat Onslaught, he unwittingly tapped into his latent cosmic power to create a pocket universe and divert the heroes there to prevent their deaths. On the Earth of this new dimension, the heroes relived altered versions of their pasts, unaware of their previous lives in the "mainstream" Marvel Universe, where they were presumed dead.
 Onslaught Reborn Counter-Earth: The fourth Counter-Earth was also created by Franklin Richards after the events of House of M unexpectedly resurrected Onslaught, who immediately resumed his mission to appropriate the power of Franklin Richards. To elude Onslaught, Franklin transported himself, the Fantastic Four, and several of the Avengers to a reality resembling the circumstances of Heroes Reborn, where the heroes had no memory of their Earth-616 lives.
 Ego the Living Planet: A sentient planet. Featured in the MCU film Guardians of the Galaxy Vol. 2.
 Hala: The home world of the Kree. Featured in MCU films Guardians of the Galaxy Vol. 2 and Captain Marvel. 
 Klyntar: An artificial planet made from symbiotes.
 Sakaar: A planet that Hulk was briefly trapped on and where he put together the Warbound during Planet Hulk under the rule of the Red King. Featured in Planet Hulk, and the Marvel Cinematic Universe film Thor: Ragnarok ruled by the Grandmaster.
 Skrullos: The home world of the Skrulls.
 Vormir: A planet that is home to the Vorms, large reptilian, energy-draining creatures that can fly through space. The planet is part of the Kree Empire. Featured in the MCU films Avengers: Infinity War and Avengers: Endgame.
Xandar: The home world of the Nova Corps, Firelord, Air-Walker and Supernova. Featured in MCU films Guardians of the Galaxy and Guardians of the Galaxy Vol. 2, mentioned to have been "decimated" by Thanos in Avengers: Infinity War.
 Zenn-La: A planet that is the home world of Silver Surfer and the Zenn-Lavians.

Satellites and planetoids
 Blue Area of the Moon: An artificial, self-sustaining, Earth-like environment on the near side of the Moon, that was created roughly 1 million years ago as part of a competition between two alien races, the Kree and the Cotati. The Skrulls, then a benevolent race, moderated this contest, whose goal was to determine the worthiness of both races by discovering which could achieve more within a set period of time. After being taken to the area of Earth's Moon where the Skrulls had created the artificial atmosphere, the Kree used their strength and rudimentary Skrull technology to create a giant city, while the Cotati were taken to another barren world in a different solar system where they created a long-term sustainable ecosystem. Learning that the Cotati were going to win the contest, the enraged Kree first slaughtered the Cotati and then attacked and killed the Skrull delegation, stole their starship, and initiated the millennia-long conflict now known as the Kree-Skrull War, which would force the Skrulls to become a society of warriors. The Blue Area of the Moon was also the home of Uatu the Watcher and a brief location for Attilan.
 Birj: The sixth moon of Marman (see above) and where Terrax is from.
 Titan: The main moon of Saturn and technologically advanced home to the Titan Eternals. Featured in the MCU films Avengers: Infinity War and Avengers: Endgame as a ruined planet and former home of Thanos.

Space stations
 Avalon: One section of the pre-existing station from the future called Graymalkin which belonged to Cable and was destroyed when S.H.I.E.L.D. tried to claim it. Magneto evidently discovered it and using his own ingenuity, as well as Shi’ar technology he had obtained during his time with the X-Men, Magneto rebuilt the station into a fortress in the sky. The station was eventually crippled when Holocaust crossed from his native timeline, the Age of Apocalypse, into the restored main one.
 Asteroid M: The secret base of Magneto.
 Starcore: an orbiting laboratory satellite space station, which first appeared in The Incredible Hulk (vol. 2) #148 (February 1972).
 Taa II: A space station of Galactus.

Outer space prisons
The following prisons are located in outer space:

AnvilAnvil is a penal colony on the planet Annoval XIV. It was the site of an attempted breakout by Nebula. First appeared in Silver Surfer (vol. 3) #74 (1993).

Kyln
The Kyln were a series of artificial moons at the edge of known space, which served both as a superhuman prison and a source of nearly unlimited power. Operations at the Kyln were overseen by the Nova Corps. All life on the Kyln moons was extinguished in Annihilation Prologue #1.

Kyln in other media
The Kyln appears as a Nova Corps prison in the film Guardians of the Galaxy. Before coming together, the members of the Guardians of the Galaxy had been imprisoned here alongside other unnamed inmates where some of them have personal issues with Gamora. The Kyln was later destroyed by Nebula on Ronan the Accuser's orders to "cleanse" it.

Negative Zone Prison Alpha
Introduced in Civil War: Frontline #5, it is a prison originally constructed to house super-villains but which acted as a holding facility for unregistered heroes during the civil war. The portal to the prison is operated by S.H.I.E.L.D. agents. The prison itself is an automated facility. Designed by Reed Richards and built by Stark Enterprises and Fantastic Four Inc., it is located in the Negative Zone. The inmates call the facility "Fantasy Island" and "Wonderland", probably because prisoners who are unable to manipulate technology to their own ends are connected to virtual reality systems.

It is also referred to as "File 42" due to it being the 42nd item on a list written by Tony Stark, Reed Richards and Hank Pym of ways to make a world with super-powered beings safer. The prison is an extremely secure, clean facility with cells custom-designed for each inhabitant. Notable inmates during the war include Iron Fist (Daredevil stand-in), Robbie Baldwin and Cloak and Dagger. After the war, it is now used for super-villains, and was known to house at the very least Taskmaster and Lady Deathstrike until Taskmaster made a deal with Camp Hammond to become an instructor and Lady Deathstrike somehow escaped as she appeared in X-Men: Messiah Complex. However, the prison was later overrun by Negative Zone ruler Blastaar.

Negative Zone Prison Alpha in other media
Prison 42 appears in the Avengers: Earth's Mightiest Heroes season 2 episode "Assault on 42", without the Civil War background as the event never happened in the cartoon's continuity. Instead, it simply serves as a new prison for superpowered individuals which is eventually attacked by Annihilus.

Stockade
A 31st-century prison planet in the Guardians of the Galaxy universe, shown in Guardians of the Galaxy #21 and #51–53. Known inmates of Stockade have included Charlie-27, Tork and Teju.

Extradimensional places
 Agamotto's dimension: The home of Agamotto.
 Ama: A pocket dimension adjacent to Earth that is home to the Amatsu-Kami.Thor & Hercules: Encyclopaedia Mythologica #1 (June 2009)
 Yomi: The Japanese underworld.
 Asgard: An other-dimensional planetoid that is the home of the Norse gods. Featured in the MCU films Thor, Thor: The Dark World, and Thor: Ragnarok; an alternate version of Asgard is featured in Avengers: Endgame.
 : A dimension where all matter is composed of ectoplasma.
 Avalon: Also known as Otherworld. Home of Merlyn, Roma, and the Captain Britain Corps; and location of Camelot, the Green Chapel, and the Starlight Citadel. Based on the mythical "Avalon".
 Badlands: A dimension that resembles the American Southwest before the European settlers came into view. The Demon Bear lives here.
 Beyond-Realm: A realm where the Beyonder lives.
 Below Place: The bottom layer of reality that is also the "lowest Hell". The One Below All resides here.
 Blackworld: An Earth-like dimension. Its historical developments took hours compared to the centuries on Earth.
 Brimstone dimension: An alternate dimension located in a dimensional rift. Azazel used this dimension to breed mutant teleporters like Abyss and Nightcrawler.
 Crimson Cosmos: A dimension where Cyttorak lives.
 : A dimension to which Dormammu and Umar were banished by the Faltine. It was inhabited by sorcerers known as the Mhuruuks.
 Darkforce dimension: A dimension where the Darkforce, a powerful energy that can be manipulated in slightly different ways by a handful of beings that are attuned to it, is drawn from.
 Dilmun: A dimension where the Annunaki live.
 Dimension Z: There are two different types of Dimension Z:
 Arnim Zola's Dimension Z: A dimension with a desert-like terrain created by Arnim Zola that is filled with mutates and technological advances. Time and space runs faster here.
 Living Eraser's Dimension Z: A dimension filled with green-skinned humanoids and containing Living Erasers.
 Djalia: A transcended plane that represented Wakanda's collective memories.
 Dreamtime: Dreamtime is the collective unconsciousness of all sentient life in the universe. It is at the border of the Dimension of Dreams.
 Alchera: The home of the Aboriginal Gods that is located in Dreamtime.
 Dream dimension: An astral realm in Dreamtime.
 Nightmare World: An area in the Dream Dimension where Nightmare lives.
 Skrull Dreamtime: An area where the Skrull Gods live.
 Eighteenth Dimension: A dimension where Magister Miracle was the Sorcerer Supreme until he was killed by the Empirikul.
 Everinnye: A dimension where the Fear Lords operate.
 Exo-Space: Also known as the Neutral Zone, the Exo-Space is a location filled with positive and negative matter that was discovered by Blue Marvel.
 Hanan Pacha: A pocket dimension adjacent to Earth that is inhabited by the Apu. Its entrance is located somewhere near Lake Titicaca.Uku Pacha: The Incan underworld.
 Heaven: An afterlife reality for good souls.
 Heliopolis: Also known as Overvoid or Othervoid, a celestial city in a dimension adjacent to Earth's, founded by the gods who were once worshipped in Egypt. This godly realm appears to be built upon a small planetary object much like the realm of Asgard, and its passage to earth is a golden bridge through space called the Path of the Gods.Duat: The Egyptian underworld.
 Hell: An afterlife reality filled with evil souls and demons.
 Kaluwalhatian: A pocket dimension adjacent to Earth that is inhabited by the Diwatas.
 Kosmos: A dimension that is the home of the Kosmosians and Growing Man. This dimension can be tapped into by Pym Particles which are like pollen on Kosmos.
 Land of Couldn't-Be Shouldn't-Be: A dimension that was created by the romantic relationship of Eternity and the Queen of Nevers. Glorian and the Shaper of Worlds live here.
 Limbo: Associated with Immortus and Rom the Spaceknight, not to be confused with Otherplace.
 Liveworld: A dimension ruled by Dreamqueen.
 Lower Aether: A dimension where Zelatrix Lavey was the Sorcerer Supreme until she was killed by the Empirikul.
 Mephisto's Realm: A dimension ruled by Mephisto. Blackheart and Lilith also reside here.
 Microverse: Any universe that is only accessible through vibrational attunement (shrinking). It is not actually the microverses that are microscopic in size but rather the nexuses which make them accessible. It is thus theoretically possible to enter the same microverse from different points on Earth. The volume of these microverses are contained within spacewalls which can only be breached at certain points. It is these breaches that create accessible portals. The microverse, known as the "Quantum Realm" in the Marvel Cinematic Universe, make appearances in the films Ant-Man, Ant-Man and the Wasp, and Avengers: Endgame, as well as the television series Agents of S.H.I.E.L.D.s series finale.
 Mojoverse: A dimension filled with spineless aliens. Mojo lives here.
 Narcisson: A dimension ruled by the Dark Gods.
 Negative Zone: A universe made of anti-matter that is contracting instead of expanding.
 Nexus of All Realities: It is located in the Florida Everglades (name also refers to a Cosmic Artifact, M'Kraan Crystal).
 Nirvana: A pocket dimension adjacent to Earth that is inhabited by the Daevas.
 : A dimension that exists outside of time and is utilized by the Time Variance Authority (TVA).
 Olympus: The other-dimensional home planetoid of superhuman beings analogous to the Greek gods.
 Hades: The Greek underworld, ruled by Pluto.
 Elysium: An area in Hades where heroic souls reside.
 Erebus: The entrance to Hades. Those who feel that they have unfinished business in life gamble at the casino there for their resurrection.
 Land Within: A region of Hades where a group of sorcerers banished the Cat People.
 Tartarus: An area in Hades where the Titans and evil souls were imprisoned.
 Orun: A pocket dimension adjacent to Earth that is home to the Vodu.
 : Also called Limbo and the Demonic Limbo, it is home to demons of various sizes, strengths, and intellects. Home of N'astirh, S'ym and formerly ruled by Belasco before being replaced by Illyana Rasputin. 
 Purple dimension: A pocket dimension ruled by the tyrannical Agamonn.
 Quidlivun: A pocket dimension adjacent to Earth that is inhabited by the Inua.
 Realm of Death: This is where Death resides.
 Realm of Madness: A dimension that is adjacent to the Nightmare World, but is beyond it and the Dream Dimension. The greatest fears of anyone take on a tangible form here.
 : An other-dimensional planet and the home of Rintrah.
 Sixth Dimension: A dimension that is the home of its Sorcerer Supreme Tiboro.
 Sominus: A mystic extra-dimensional realm that is a "dark reflection" of Therea and is ruled by Thog.
 Soul World: A dimension that exists within the Soul Infinity Gem.
 Svarga: A pocket dimension adjacent to Earth that is home to the Dievas.
 Ta-Lo: Created in Thor #310 (1980) by writers Mark Gruenwald and Ralph Macchio, and artist Keith Pollard. A pocket dimension adjacent to Earth that is home to the Xian race. Ta-Lo is inhabited by Chinese mythological creatures, such as dragons, fenghuang, shishi, hundun, jiuweihu, and qilin.Shang-Chi (vol. 2) #7 (January 2022) Jiang Li, mother of Shang-Chi was into one of Ta-Lo's few communities of mortals known Qilin Riders.
 Taivas: A pocket dimension adjacent to Earth that is home to the Jumala.
 Therea: A mystic extra-dimensional realm where two benevolent gods dwell who appear in the form of dogs to human eyes. It is an Earth-like land of peace and tranquility and has a "dark reflection" in Sominus. Therea is ruled by twin gods, Zokk and Maftra. Zokk and Maftra are worshipped by the barbarian Korrek and his people, and even revered by Dakimh the Enchanter.
 Thirteenth ximension: A dimension where Szandor Sozo was the Sorcerer Supreme until Empirikul's Witchfinder Wolves caught up to him when he fled and was "purified" by holy acid.
 Topán: A pocket dimension adjacent to Earth that is home to the Teteoh.
 Twelfth ximension: A shadow realm whose creatures like Shadow Goblins and Magma Serpents are invisible to the eyes of those not of the Twelfth Dimension.
 Underspace: A plane of reality that is below the Microverse. This is where Hank Pym placed the Infinite Avengers Mansion.
 Upperworld: A pocket dimension adjacent to Earth that is home to the Ahau.
 White-Hot Room: A quasi-mystical place that holds the essences of Phoenix hosts. In-between her frequent resurrections, this is apparently where the soul of Jean Grey finds herself. It also appears to be where the Phoenix Force itself goes when it is killed, and how it always flares back to life (hence its name). The essences trapped in the White Hot Room do not seem to notice the passage of time, yet are able to see events occurring in the normal universe. Jean Grey has shown the ability to "project" herself to the X-Men on at least two occasions, although it is unknown if this ability is a function of the Phoenix Force or the White Hot Room itself.
 Zephyrland: An underwater dimension that is peaceful. Virago took over the city until she was defeated by Namor and Doctor Strange.

Organizations

Government agencies
 Aladdin: In the Ultraverse setting, Aladdin was a U.S. government agency apparently founded sometime in the 1960s to deal with the growing number of Ultras (super-powered beings) in their world. In 1970, their scientific division, using a synthesis of organic brain tissue and computer systems called G.E.N.I.E. (Genetically Engineered Neural Intelligence Experiment), was examining alien technology and corpses discovered by U.S. soldiers during the Vietnam War, when some unknown event caused the corpses to release a cloud of material which caused G.E.N.I.E. to develop sentience and grow into a true fusion of organic and mechanical technology.
 Aladdin Assault Squad: In the Malibu Ultraverse, the Aladdin Assault Squad was a special department within the government agency known as Aladdin. The Aladdin Assault Squad was created in response to the growing number of Ultras (superhumans). The A.A.S. operated out of Aladdin's Groom Lake facility, and functioned as an independent internal security force. They also assisted ongoing Ultra research. Known members of the Aladdin Assault Squad are: Dirt Devil, Foxfire, the Grip, Hardwire, Headknocker, and War Eagle.
 A.R.M.O.R. Black Air The Commission on Superhuman Activities (also known as the Commission on Superhuman Affairs or CSA for short): A government agency created by the President of the United States of America that monitors superhumans. They have an office in Washington, D.C. A number of members of the Commission when created were involved with various government projects regarding superhumans: Project Wideawake, former and current Avengers liaisons, Freedom Force liaison and super soldier projects.
 Department H: A fictitious branch of Canada's Department of National Defence that deals with super-powered persons. Department H was responsible for bringing together and managing the Marvel Comics team known as Alpha Flight and its related teams Beta Flight, Gamma Flight, and Omega Flight. It was mentioned in the Agents of S.H.I.E.L.D. episode "End of the Beginning" and alluded in the films X2: X-Men United and Captain America: The Winter Soldier.
 Department K: The Canadian government group which secretly operated the Weapon X Project.
 Euromind: Another European subdivision of S.H.I.E.L.D., called Euromind, was introduced in the Marvel Italia series Europa.
 F.I.6: A British Intelligence agency, and former employers of Micromax. Led by Brigadier Theodore 'Inky' Blott. Employed psychics. Disbanded after most agents, including Blott, were killed by Necrom. Introduced in Excalibur and created by Alan Davis.
 G.R.A.M.P.A.: The covert organization known as G.R.A.M.P.A., the Global Reaction Agency for Mysterious Paranormal Activity, debuted in Amazing Fantasy (vol. 2) #15. G.R.A.M.P.A.'s most prominent field operatives are Ace and One-Eyed Jacquie; the two agents refer to themselves collectively as "Blackjack". G.R.A.M.P.A. is tasked with protecting the world from paranormal threats.
 H.A.M.M.E.R. H.A.T.E.: The Highest Anti-Terrorism Effort, better known by its acronym, is one of two antagonistic organizations in Nextwave: Agents of H.A.T.E. H.A.T.E. and its leader, Dirk Anger, are parodies of Marvel's S.H.I.E.L.D. and Nick Fury. H.A.T.E. is a government agency that is funded by the Beyond Corporation, a company that was formerly a terrorist cell called S.I.L.E.N.T. (the acronym has not been explained yet).
 The Lodge: Created by Basil Wentworth towards the end of World War II, the Lodge's purpose was to prepare for the Cold War that was destined to come about. The Lodge started covert operations in China, the Soviet Union, and East Germany, and has continued its "dirty tricks" into the present day.
 MI-13
 Mutant Response Division: A mutant-hunting group founded by known anti-mutant scientists Steven Lang and Bolivar Trask and funded by Bastion via the United Nations. It is also referred to by its abbreviated name MRD. The organization's first appearance outside comic books was in Wolverine and the X-Men and The Avengers: Earth's Mightiest Heroes.  Similar groups are introduced in the X-Men films such as in Deadpool 2 under Department of Mutant Containment (DMC) and in Dark Phoenix as Mutant Containment Unit (MCU) as an unintentional easter egg for the Marvel Cinematic Universe.
 Office of National Emergency: Commonly referred to as O*N*E, it is known as the originator of the Sentinel squads that were assigned to protect/observe the X-Men and the remaining mutants after the event known as M-Day, which reduced the number of mutants on Earth to only a few hundred.
 Project Pegasus: An organization that was originally intended to research alternative (and unusual) forms of energy located in New York. It has also been used as a prison for super-powered individuals, prior to the creation of The Vault. Pegasus is featured in the Marvel Cinematic Universe films The Avengers and Captain Marvel.
 Project Wideawake: A government program with the purpose of detecting and capturing mutants, which employs the robots known as Sentinels.The New Mutants #2
 R.C.X.: The Resources Control Executive is a British intelligence agency, introduced in Captain Britain as a replacement to S.T.R.I.K.E. and created by Jamie Delano and Alan Davis. The British intelligence agency for the investigation of paranormal and superhuman activity known as S.T.R.I.K.E. was infiltrated by a criminal organization and nearly all of its members were killed. A weakened S.T.R.I.K.E., unable to deal with the consequences of the Jaspers' Warp, was subsequently disbanded, and the Resources Control Executive (R.C.X.) was created to take its place. The members of the R.C.X. use codenames based on biblical figures to hide their true identity.
 S.A.F.E.: Introduced in Marvel's line of novels in the mid-1990s, S.A.F.E. (Strategic Action For Emergencies) is the United States' answer to S.H.I.E.L.D. They first appeared in Spider-Man & the Incredible Hulk: Rampage (Doom's Day Book 1), and may not be part of comics canon. Whereas S.H.I.E.L.D. is a UN-funded and run organization dealing with international incidents, S.A.F.E. is tasked with similar duties inside of America's borders. It is run by Colonel Sean Morgan and a prominently featured agent is Joshua Ballard, who, among other things, survived an encounter with Doctor Doom and later Baron Zemo.
 S.H.I.E.L.D.: Strategtic Hazard Intervention Enforcement Logistics Division is the United States' top spy agency led by Nick Fury.
 S.T.A.R.S.: The Commission on Superhuman Activities, created a special division of the federal government's U.S. Marshals called S.T.A.R.S., the Superhuman Tactical Activities Response Squad. A federal organization authorized to monitor and manage all activities regarding the supervision, apprehension, and detention of superhuman criminals in the United States. The group's leader was John Walker, the U.S. Agent. S.T.A.R.S. uncovered a Ruul plot to use Earth as a penal colony for alien criminals. U.S. Agent and S.T.A.R.S. were ultimately responsible for exposing and defeating the Ruul.
 S.T.A.K.E.: Special Threat Assessment for Known Extranormalities. was a S.H.I.E.L.D. project inspired by Dum Dum Dugan's Howling Commandos, which focused on dealing with supernatural occurrences. At the time when Hydra took over S.H.I.E.L.D. during Secret Empire and most of the United States, the Howling Commandos alongside S.T.A.K.E. fell under Hydra's control
 S.T.R.I.K.E. Superhuman Restraint Unit S.W.O.R.D.: Sentient World Observation And Response Department is an agency that deals with cosmic threats to Earth.
 Ultimate S.H.I.E.L.D.: The Ultimate Marvel version of S.H.I.E.L.D.
 W.A.N.D.: Wizardry Alchemy Necromancy Department, the magical division of S.H.I.E.L.D. Introduced in the Marvel NOW! relaunch of Thunderbolts.
 Weapon X
 W.H.O.: The Weird Happenings Organization was mandated by the UK government with the investigation into and research of supernatural and paranormal phenomena until it was replaced by Black Air. It was featured in Excalibur.

Criminal organizations
 Advanced Idea Mechanics: Advanced Idea Mechanics first appeared in Strange Tales #146. A.I.M. is a conglomeration of brilliant scientists and their hirelings dedicated to the acquisition of power and the overthrow of all governments by technological means. A.I.M. was organized late in World War II by Baron Wolfgang von Strucker to develop advanced weaponry for his subversive organization HYDRA. They were close to developing and attaining nuclear weapons when HYDRA Island was invaded by American and Japanese troops. Although A.I.M. suffered a major setback, it survived and grew in secret over the following decades.
 Beyond Corporation: What is now the Beyond Corporation was once a high-tech terrorist cell known as S.I.L.E.N.T. which legitimized itself as the Beyond Corporation, yet did not abandon their ulterior motive—the location, activation, distribution, and testing of various Unusual Weapons of Mass Destruction at various points throughout the United States of America. Also, through "faith-based bidding", the Beyond Corporation became the sole financial backer of the H.A.T.E. (Highest Anti-Terrorism Effort), providing them with extremely advanced technology. The organization later became the sponsor of Ben Reilly during the Beyond storyline.
 Black Spectre: Jerome Beechman, the Mandrill, created Black Spectre by organizing his female followers, who disguised themselves as men using bulky armor. Beechman planned to use Black Spectre to confuse America through terrorism and racism, instilling chaos in the world and intending to rule it after anarchy ensued.
 Brotherhood of Mutants: The Brotherhood of Mutants, originally known as the Brotherhood of Evil Mutants and briefly as Freedom Force and the Brotherhood, is a Marvel Comics supervillain team devoted to mutant superiority over normal humans. They are adversaries of the X-Men. The original Brotherhood was created by writer Stan Lee and artist/co-writer Jack Kirby and first appeared in The X-Men #4 (March 1964).
 Friends of Humanity: The Friends of Humanity is a human-supremacist hate group started by Graydon Creed, a man infamous for his bigotry against mutants. Groups inspired by or splintered from the Friends of Humanity include the survivalist Humanity's Last Stand and the religious fundamentalist Church of Humanity.
 Gene Nation: On the anniversary of the Mutant Massacre, a horrific event in which Mr. Sinister's henchmen the Marauders killed many Morlocks, the members of the terrorist group known as Gene Nation reappeared in the main universe (Earth-616). Their mission was to destroy one human for every Morlock life that was lost.
 The Hand: The Hand is a cult of evil, mystical ninja who are heavily involved in organized crime and mercenary activities such as assassination plots. The Hand covets power above all other objectives. They are primarily based in Japan, but operate internationally. They were founded in the 16th century, and soon became servants of the primordial demon known only as the Beast.
 Hellfire Club: Although the club appears to merely be an international social club for wealthy elites, its Inner Circle consists of mutants who try to influence world events for the accumulation of power. They dress in 18th century garb and rank themselves in a system of chess pieces (Black Rook, White Queen, etc.). The group first battled the X-Men in the classic "The Dark Phoenix Saga" and the club, or branches of it, have since appeared periodically in various X-Men series. The club is based on the actual Hellfire Club, a secret society of 18th century England.
 Humanity's Last Stand: Humanity's Last Stand is a radical anti-mutant hate group and enemies of the X-Men. In the group's first appearance they were behind the creation of a false Mutant Liberation Front, formed by human members of H.L.S. posing as mutants through the use of mutagenic drugs and/or technologically enhanced suits, to mimic mutant powers.
 HYDRA: A terrorist organization that first appeared in Strange Tales #135. In its original continuity, it was headed by nondescript businessman Arnold Brown, who was killed by S.H.I.E.L.D.. It soon returned, however, headed by Baron Wolfgang von Strucker, under the aegis of the Nazi Red Skull; HYDRA's changing origin was one of the earliest Marvel retcons. After its initial defeat, several of its branches surfaced, appearing to be unrelated and independent. HYDRA's scientific branch was initially A.I.M. (Advanced Idea Mechanics), which later split off into its own organization. Other factions included THEM (the ruling council of HYDRA) and the Secret Empire (which, like A.I.M., also split off into its own organization).
 Maggia: An international crime syndicate, somewhat similar to the Mafia, but differing in that they frequently hire supervillains and mad scientists to work for them. Count Nefaria and his daughter Madame Masque have both been leaders of an important Maggia family.
 Maelstrom's Minions: A trio of supervillains that work for Maelstrom. They are Gronk, Helio, and Phobius.
 Mys-Tech: The board of Mys-Tech, a multinational corporation, were originally seven mages who in AD 987 sold their souls to the demon Mephisto in exchange for immortality.  The Mys-Tech board members must provide a steady stream of souls to the demon, otherwise they will breach their contract and forfeit their own souls.  Over the years, the board accumulated power and wealth and in the modern age this power and wealth became a business empire.
 National Force: The National Force is a neo-fascist organization founded by Doctor Faustus. Faustus had captured William Burnside, the fourth Captain America, and his partner Jack Monroe, both heroes from the 1950s, frozen in suspended animation. Faustus took control of the mind of the replacement Captain America in an attempt to use him against Steve Rogers, the original Captain America, and later turned him into the Grand Director.
 Purifiers: A paramilitary group of Christian terrorists led by William Stryker, also known as the "Stryker Crusade". The group debuted in the graphic novel X-Men: God Loves, Man Kills. The Purifiers see themselves in a holy war against mutants, believing them to be the children of the devil and thus deserving of extermination.
 Roxxon: A massive petroleum corporation notorious for its determination to make massive profits regardless of any laws or moral principles, often employing superhuman criminals to achieve their goals.
 Secret Empire: The subversive organization known as the Secret Empire has followed a number of different leaders, always known as "Number One". The Secret Empire began as a subsidiary of HYDRA, which provided it with financial support. The Secret Empire served to distract the attention of authorities such as S.H.I.E.L.D. from HYDRA's activities, although the original Number One sought to break away from HYDRA.
 Serpent Society: An organization of snake-themed terrorists that was initially formed from the membership of two previous supervillain teams, both of them called the Serpent Squad. The group, like its predecessor, has been made up of longtime antagonists of Captain America and his fellow Avengers. The Serpent Society was the brainchild of Seth Voelker (Sidewinder) and is a descendant of sorts from the original two Serpent Squads.
 Sons of the Serpent:  A subversive organization of costumed American racist super-patriots who oppose all racial, ethnic, and religious minorities. They sought to subvert America through hate crimes and organized protests, and were opposed by the Avengers and the Defenders.
 THEM: THEM, through its founder Baron Strucker, is the managing power of a supraorganization which includes HYDRA, A.I.M., and the Secret Empire. THEM was founded by Nazi war criminal Baron Strucker after World War II. Later Strucker appointed a businessman named Arnold Brown to the position of Supreme Hydra; HYDRA's highly visible operations served as a front for THEM.
 U.L.T.I.M.A.T.U.M.: The Underground Liberated Totally Integrated Mobile Army To Unite Mankind is a terrorist organization in the Marvel Comics universe. It was founded by the Flag-Smasher in his attempts to destroy nationalism. Most notably, they have been engaged in a feud with Deadpool ever since he slaughtered many of them aboard their own helicarrier, downed it (dooming the remaining), and confronted them (led by a new Flag-Smasher) in a final revenge showdown on a Kansas farm, where Deadpool slaughtered every single one of them (presumably ending them for good).
 The Universal Church of Truth: The Universal Church of Truth is a star-spanning religious empire headed by the Magus, and enemies of the Guardians of the Galaxy. A different version of the Universal Church appeared in the second volume of Guardians of the Galaxy, The Thanos Imperative miniseries, and Annihilators: Earthfall miniseries. The church was responsible for resurrecting Thanos and the Magus.
 Zodiac Cartel: The original Zodiac group debuted in the title the Avengers and is established as a criminal organization founded and funded by member Cornelius Van Lunt (who adopts the identity of Taurus). The group's identity is based on the zodiac from the discipline astrology, with each member adopting the persona of a sign of the zodiac, being 12 in all. The group members share leadership of the organization, with the position rotating just as the astrological zodiac changes.

Alien races

 Kree – A blue-skinned alien race.
 Skrulls – Green-skinned shape-shifting aliens. 
 Shi'ar – Bird-like aliens.
 Symbiotes – Amorphous, shape-shifting alien symbiotes.
 Watchers – A species who are committed to observing and compiling knowledge on all aspects of the universe, and vowed to never interfere with other civilizations.
 Chitauri – Reptilian cyborg warriors.
 Badoon – Reptilian aliens who live under strict gender segregation.
 Brood – Insect-like, parasitic, aliens.
 Phalanx – A cybernetic species with a telepathic hive mind connection.
 Cotati – Intelligent, telepathic, plant-like aliens.

Objects
Vehicles

 Atomic Steed: The Black Knight sometimes employs one of the "Atomic Steeds" built by the Knights of Wundagore, engineered by the High Evolutionary.
 Battle Van: The Battle Van was used by the Punisher as his primary mode of transportation. It is customized with a various array of weaponry and armor, and serves as a mobile armory.
 Blackbird: The Blackbird is the X-Men's primary aircraft.
 Fantastic Four's Pogo Plane: so called because of its tail-down landing/take-off attitude, was the first significant air-breathing engine design of Reed Richards. Employing new turbine blade configurations and a new titanium-alloy process, Richards increased overall engine performance to a very high thrust-to-weight ratio. It is loosely based on the never mass-produced Convair XFY Pogo.
 Fantasticar: Various flying hovercraft used by the Fantastic Four, most versions are able to split into four smaller vehicles.
 Freedom's Lady: The original Guardians of the Galaxy operate from the Starship Freedom's Lady, a medium-weight,  Annihilator-class battleship of 30th century Earth design. Trans-light power is furnished by inter-reacting tachyon and anti-tachyon beams. Fully equipped for deep-space and inter-galactic excursion, it carried a full complement of offensive weapons as well as an impenetrable energy barrier, divided into 14 overlapping segments.
 Goblin Glider: A metal bat-shaped glider that Green Goblin uses to travel around the skies.
 Hellcycle: Ghost Rider's flaming motorcycle. The vehicle is created by the Ghost Rider's own mystical hellfire being imbued in an otherwise normal motorcycle, usually the property of the Ghost Rider's host at the time.
The time machine itself is a device whose major timestream-bridging components are the size of a two-drawer file cabinet. It utilizes energy to generate a chronal-displacement internal field, enabling a being or object to break through the "reality walls" of the timestream into the trans-temporal realm of Limbo, from which all time eras and alternate worlds are accessible.
 The Leapfrog: The Leapfrog is the method of transportation for the Runaways.
 Mooncopter: Moon Knight's copter is a VTOL vehicle capable of precision, computer-assisted maneuvering for air-land-and-sea rescues, tracking automobiles through traffic, and many other purposes. Moon Knight is in constant contact with the copter, piloted by Frenchie (but also with a sophisticated, computer-aided auto-pilot), at all times via a miniature transceiver with a microphone in his cowl. The on-board computer performs navigation functions, remote sensor image-enhancement, and radar interpretation. Moon Knight has had at least two different designs of copter. One resembled a conventional helicopter with a crescent moon tail. The second actually resembled an airship more than a helicopter, but was also crescent shaped.Quinjet: A technologically advanced S.H.I.E.L.D. jet used primarily by the Avengers, the Quinjet first appeared in The Avengers #61 (February 1969).
 S.H.I.E.L.D. flying car: The flying car is a S.H.I.E.L.D. personal vehicle that looks like a car but can fly. It made appearances in Spider-Man and his Amazing Friends and Spider-Man. In Captain America: The First Avenger, Howard Stark unveils a flying car at 1943 Stark Expo. A flying car appears in the possession of Phil Coulson in the TV series Agents of S.H.I.E.L.D. called "Lola", a 1962 red Chevrolet Corvette (C1). Flying Car makes its final appearance in Agent Carter season 2, final episode "Hollywood Ending."
 S.H.I.E.L.D. Helicarrier: The aircraft used by S.H.I.E.L.D. around the world.
 Ship: Apocalypse's gigantic, self-aware AI ship which was simply known as "Ship". It is hinted to have been built by the Celestials. It made several appearances in the comics as well as the 1990s X-Men cartoon series.
 Shockwave Rider: The superhero team Nextwave steals the Shockwave Rider, its base of operations, from H.A.T.E., a compromised anti-terrorist organization. The Shockwave Rider is powered by a Zero-Point Squirt Drive, giving it a nearly unlimited fuel supply. The Rider contains 5 tesseract zones, allowing it to be spacious on the inside while keeping it compact on the outside. To deploy in the field, the team dives through a pool of an orange membrane to exit via the underside of the ship. It was destroyed in Nextwave's final battle with the Beyond Corporation.
 Skuttlebutt: A Korbinite-designed sentient starship, vehicle of Beta Ray Bill where it's A.I. serves as his companion.
 Sky Bike: Hawkeye sometimes travels about in a custom-built sky bike (also called a sky-cycle or skymobile), designed and built at Cross Technological Enterprises. It is voice-operated and requires no hands to steer. The sky bike first appeared in Hawkeye #1 (September 1983). It was also featured in Iron Man. Hawkeye also uses the bike in The Avengers: Earth's Mightiest Heroes.

Weapons
 Absorbing Man's ball and chain
 Ant-Man's armor and helmet
 Black Panther's Panther Habit armor
 Black Widow's Bite stingers and gauntlets
 Blade's sword
 Captain America's shield
 Chase Stein's fistigons
 Cloak's cloak
 Colleen Wing's katana
 Cyclops's visor
 Daredevil's billy club
 Deadpool's katanas and guns
 Doctor Octopus's mechanical tentacles
 Drax's dual knives
 Ebony Blade, a sword wielded by Black Knight
 Elektra's sais
 Falcon's wing harness
 Gamma Bomb
 Gamora's Godslayer sword
 Ghost Rider's chain and hellfire shotgun
 Gorr's All-Black the Necrosword
 Quake's gauntlets
 Green Goblin's pumpkin bombs
 Hawkeye's bow and trick arrows
 Hercules's mace
 Hulkling's Excelsior sword
 Iron Man's armors
 Iron Man's Hulkbuster armor
 Kraven the Hunter's spear
 Magneto's helmet
 Misty Knight's bionic arm
 Mjolnir, the hammer of Thor
 Moon Knight's crescent darts
 Mysterio's helmet
 Namor's trident
 The Nova Force of Nova 
 Pepper Potts's sword and shield
 Psylocke's katana
 Punisher's arsenal of weapons
 Rocket Raccoon's arsenal of guns
 Scorpion's mechanical tail
 Shocker's gauntlets
 The Soulsword, wielded by Magik
 Spider-Man's web shooters
 Star-Lord's helmet
 Star-Lord's quad-blasters
 Stormbreaker, the hammer of Beta Ray Bill
 The Tactigon
 Taskmaster's sword and shield
 Vulture's electro-magnetic wing harness
 War Machine's armor
 Wasp's armor and helmet
 Winter Soldier's bionic arm
 Wolverine's adamantium claws

Artifacts
Some items have been created specifically for the Marvel Universe and many of them carry immense powers:

Mystical artifacts
 Book of the Vishanti: A grimoire most closely associated with Doctor Strange. It is the greatest known source of "white" magical knowledge on the Earth of the Marvel Universe dimension.
 The : An Asgardian relic and the greatest weapon of Malekith the Accursed. When opened, it can reproduce the infinite icy cold of Niflheim. Later entrusted to the care of Edwin Jarvis, butler to the Avengers, by Thor. Causes its holder to grow younger gradually.
 The Cloak of Levitation: A potent mystical item worn by Doctor Strange. It has the primary purpose of granting its wearer levitation. The greatest advantage of this is that its wearer need know little about the mystic arts to operate it, nor must the wearer use any of his "mystical strength" to operate it.
 The : also known as The Book of Sins, is a grimoire and collection of iron-bound scrolls containing the collected magical knowledge of the Elder God-turned demon Chthon, the first practitioner of dark magics. The Darkhold has appeared in the Marvel Cinematic Universe television series Agents of S.H.I.E.L.D., Runaways, WandaVision, and the 2022 film Doctor Strange in the Multiverse of Madness. It first appeared in the Werewolf by Night story in Marvel Spotlight #4.
 Dragonfang: An enchanted sword said to be carved by the wizard Kahji-Da from a tooth of an extra-dimensional dragon wielded by Valkyrie
 The : A limited magical stone that turns the emotions of a person into reality, found among the Dark Elves.
 The Evil Eye of Avalon: A powerful blasting device used by Prester John.
 The Eye of Agamotto: An artifact that is worn by Doctor Strange.
 The Orb of Agamotto: A globe in the possession of Doctor Strange.
 Mjolnir: The Hammer of Thor.
 The : After defeating Shou-Lao, Danny Rand acquired the power of the Iron Fist. He had the mark of the Dragon burned onto his chest, which allowed him to channel his Chi into his fist to turn it into a powerful weapon.
 The Serpent Crown: Created by the demon Set, it links the wearer to its creator, providing various physical and mental powers.
 The Siege Perilous is the name of two devices, the first appearing in Captain Britain comics, and the second in X-Men comics. Both devices were created by writer Chris Claremont, who named it after the Siege Perilous, the empty chair at King Arthur's round table. The latter device, featured in X-Men, had the ability to transport individuals to new locations with rejuvenated, amnesiac bodies.
 The : A powerful magical staff used by the runaway Nico Minoru. Whenever Nico bleeds, the staff emerges from her chest, allowing Nico to bend magic.
 Stormbreaker: The hammer of Beta Ray Bill.
 The Twilight sword: The weapon of the giant Surtur.
 The : An artifact controlled by the thoughts of the wielder, and can be used to project and absorb mystical energy; create force fields; control weather; open dimensional portals; observe events in other locations and heal wounds. Used thousands of years before the modern era by priestess of the god Yog against the barbarian Conan, it is sought out by Xandu in modern times to destroy Doctor Strange. The Wand first appears in The Amazing Spider-Man Annual #2 (December 1965) and was created by Stan Lee and Steve Ditko.

Cosmic artifacts
The Cosmic Cube
The Cosmic Egg: A powerful artifact created by the Goddess from combining 30 Cosmic Cubes.
The Phoenix Egg: Every time it is destroyed, the Phoenix Force is always reborn within a cosmic egg. This process has happened several times in the past.
Infinity Gems/Infinity Gauntlet: Six gems that grant their owner supreme power over six different aspects of existence: Mind, Power, Soul, Time, Space, and Reality. They can be combined in the Gauntlet. A seventh gem was discovered in another dimension. This gem, called the Ego gem, contained the essence of the entity Nemesis, whose self-destruction created the gems.
Abundant Gems/Abundant Glove: Six "marginally powerful" gems – the Compassion, Laughter, Dance, Respect, and "another Dance Gem".M'Kraan Crystal': The "nexus of realities" (unknown if it is connected to the "Nexus of All Realities" located in the Florida Everglades). By entering the crystal, users can enter any universe they wish. The protector of the crystal is singular in all universes, with the same memories in each, which suggests that the reality immediately surrounding the crystal is anchored in place.
Quantum bands, used by Quasar and temporarily used by Silver Surfer to wield cosmic energy.
The Silver Surfer's surfboard (his source of power in the movie), which he is mentally linked to. When it is destroyed, the Surfer can recreate another at will.
The Ultimate Nullifier
Heart of the Universe
Cosmic Regulator

Other artifacts
Cerebro
The Legacy Virus, a devastating plague that tore through the mutant population.
The Mandarin's Ten Rings
The Tallus

Substances
Drugs
 Goblin formula (OZ Formula): The chemical formula that gave the Green Goblin his powers.
 Growth pills: Capsules containing the size-altering Pym particles that allow Giant Man, Ant-Man, and the Wasp to change their size.
 Extremis: A techno-organic virus created in an attempt to recreate the Super-Soldier Serum that gave Captain America his powers.
 Lizard formula: The chemical formula that transforms scientist Dr. Curt Connors into his reptilian form, the Lizard.
 Red Skull's Dust of Death: A red powder which kills a victim within seconds of skin contact. The powder causes the skin of the victim's head to shrivel, tighten, and take on a red discoloration, while causing the hair to fall out; hence, the victim's head resembles a "red skull".
 Super Soldier Serum: An experimental military drug that enhances physical abilities and gave several superheroes their powers, most notably Captain America.
 Terrigen mists: A mutagenic catalyst discovered and used by the Inhumans that can grant superpowers, but leaves many subjects with deformities and amnesia.

Elemental substances and minerals
Adamantium, a virtually indestructible metal alloy which is best known for being integrated into the skeleton and claws of Wolverine and was created in an attempt to duplicate the Vibranium-steel alloy of Captain America's shield.
Carbonadium
Promethium, not to be confused with the real-life element, a magical metal found only in Belasco's dimension, known as Otherplace.
Tritonium, an unstable radioactive mineral.
Vibranium, a metal which comes in two forms; one variety (Wakandan) absorbs vibratory and kinetic energy, while the other (Antarctic) causes all nearby metals to melt. Vibranium is a component of Captain America's shield alloy.
Uru, the Asgardian metal of which Thor's hammer is made.
Scabrite, a god-like metal which can only be found in the mines of Surtur's realm. Surtur possesses the giant sword Twilight, also known as the Sword of Doom, composed of Scabrite. The sword is magical, capable of manipulating vast amounts of mystical energy.
Gravitonium, a fictitious element on the periodic table. This substance can control gravity fields (Agents of S.H.I.E.L.D.'' television series).
Yaka, a sound-sensitive metal found on Centauri IV
Plandanium, a metal used by the Spaceknights of Galador to make their armor
Netheranium, a psychosensitive metal found only in "Satan's" extra-dimensional realm. The Son of Satan, Daimon Hellstrom wielded a trident made of netheranium.

Cosmic forces
Enigma Force
Uni Force
Goblyn Force
Nova Force
Omega Force
Phoenix Force
Power Cosmic
Power Primordial

See also
 List of fictional towns in comics
 DC Comics:
 List of locations of the DC Universe
 List of DC Comics teams and organizations
 List of government agencies in DC Comics
 List of criminal organizations in DC Comics

References

Marvel Comics locations
Marvel Comics-related lists